Cary Harris (born March 22, 1987) is an American football safety who was most recently a member of the Edmonton Eskimos. He was drafted by the Buffalo Bills in the sixth round of the 2009 NFL Draft. He played college football at Southern California as a cornerback. He currently is the head football coach at Calabasas High School, (Calabasas, California).

Harris has also been a member of the Minnesota Vikings, Cincinnati Bengals, and New York Giants.

Early years
Harris prepped at Notre Dame High School in Sherman Oaks, California where he played running back and cornerback and ran a 10.75 100 meter dash in track.

College career
Harris was a three-year starter between 2006 and 2008.  He played reserve in 2005.  He was a two-time All-Pac-10 honorable mention player in 2007 and 2008 and was considered a top cornerback for the 2009 NFL Draft.

Harris was one of twelve USC players invited to the 2009 NFL Scouting Combine that season.

Professional football

Buffalo Bills
Harris was drafted by the Buffalo Bills in the sixth round (183rd overall) of the 2009 NFL Draft. He was waived during final cuts on September 5, 2009, but was re-signed to the team's practice squad on September 6. He was promoted to the active roster on November 20, and recorded two interceptions in the final game of the 2009 season against the Indianapolis Colts. He was re-signed on March 29, 2010.

He was released by the Bills on October 22, 2010, and worked out for the Philadelphia Eagles shortly afterward, but was not offered a contract.

Minnesota Vikings
On November 24, 2010, Harris was signed to the Minnesota Vikings' practice squad, but was released on December 1.

Cincinnati Bengals
Harris was signed to the Cincinnati Bengals' practice squad on December 14, 2010.

New York Giants
Harris signed a reserve/future contract with the New York Giants on January 13, 2011. He was waived/injured on August 16 and later reverted to injured reserve. He was released with an injury settlement on August 28.

References

External links
Cincinnati Bengals bio
Minnesota Vikings bio
Buffalo Bills bio
USC Trojans football bio

1987 births
Living people
American football cornerbacks
American football safeties
Buffalo Bills players
Cincinnati Bengals players
Edmonton Elks players
Minnesota Vikings players
New York Giants players
People from Pacoima, Los Angeles
Players of American football from Los Angeles
USC Trojans football players
Players of Canadian football from Los Angeles